The NZR J class steam locomotives were a type of 4-8-2 steam locomotive built for the New Zealand Railways Department (NZR) and used on the New Zealand railway network. Built by the North British Locomotive Works, although designed to work on the lighter secondary lines the class was frequently used on mainline express passenger trains as well as freight. The class first appeared in distinctive streamlining, which was later removed from 1947 onwards for maintenance reasons. The class should not be confused with the earlier 1874 J class. Three J class lasted until the end of steam-hauled services on 26 October 1971, three locomotives of the forty built have been preserved.

History
The J class were primarily designed to provide a mixed traffic locomotive more powerful than the AB class that was capable of running on the lighter secondary lines of the New Zealand Railways network, but was equally capable of running express passenger trains on main routes which were being operated by the larger K Class locomotives and the in-production KA class and KB classes. As the NZR workshops were already busy with the production of the KAs and KBs, the North British Locomotive Company were engaged to build the class of 40 locomotives. The J class incorporated a number of similar features with the contemporaneous KA and KB classes, such as roller bearing axles, hydrostatic lubrication and twin Westinghouse brake pumps; however they used bar frames instead of plate frames, and were equipped with Baker Valve-gear instead of Walschaerts. They also featured a Vanderbilt tender, and were outshopped with distinctive bullet-nosed streamlining which bears similarity to the Norfolk and Western Railway class J (1941) and the later NSWGR 38 class.

In service
The first 30 of the class were allocated to the North Island, with the last 10 allocated to the South Island for use on the hilly section between Dunedin and Oamaru. They were immediately placed into service on the main trunk routes in both islands in order to help move wartime traffic during World War II. Although used on freight trains as well, the class was well suited to high-speed running on the passenger trains of the era. Due to the wartime conditions, the streamlining became burdensome for maintenance and the skyline casing, which was open at the top proved to be a trap for soot from the locomotive's exhaust. After a time, the skyline casing started to be removed from some examples of the class leaving them with just the bullet nose. The design was successful enough that NZR opted to build an improved variant called the JA class in its Hillside workshops from 1946, and by 1950 enough JA class had been introduced into service that the ten South Island-based J class locomotives were transferred to the North Island. From this time onwards the J class lost their streamlining, either all at once during overhaul or if the skyline casing had already been removed, then only the bullet nose with the headlight moved to the same position as adopted by the JA class. Around this time also, some of the J class members had the twin Westinghouse pumps removed in favour of the Cross-compound pump used by the JA class - but not all J class engines were fitted with this.

JB class

After World War II the railways suffered problematic coal shortages, especially in the North Island. Approval was gained to convert 12 of the J class locomotives into oil-burners, to burn heavy fuel oil which was available in plentiful quantities at the time. The conversion saw the installation of a two-nozzle burner in the firebox, removal of the grate and ashpan which was replaced with a firepan lined with bricks, shortening of the superheater tubes in the boiler, removal of the spark arrester in the smokebox, removal of the brick arch, addition of the related controls and gauges for the oil burning equipment, and the tender modified to carry an oil bunker and associated steam piping. Similar to the K and KA Classes which were converted to oil burning at the same time, the JB Class utilized a separate, removable tank which sat in the former coal space.  However, the full-width coal bunker of the J class Vanderbilt tender was cut down so that the oil tank was visible at the sides, with distinctive vertical supports below. The conversion process generally coincided with the removal of the streamlining, but not always. Once converted, the locomotives were re-classified JB in recognition of the conversion, however, they retained their original J class numbers.

In service the JB class performed well but did not distinguish themselves above the unconverted J class nor any of the other J variants. Some of the JB Class received cross-compound Westinghouse pumps in place of the twin single-phase pumps, but others did not. The JB Class only ever saw service in the North Island, as in the South Island coal supplies were plentiful. Some years after conversion to oil, the fuel oil being used became considerably dearer than the coal supplies then being sourced, and there was no longer a coal shortage. Conversion back to coal burning did not occur due to objections from the various railway Unions.

Withdrawal and disposal 
Some members of the JB class were among the first of the J 4-8-2 types to be withdrawn, due to the faster wear and tear suffered by the locomotives as a result of oil burning. The last of the JBs were withdrawn by Dec 1967, but 4 JA remained on the books in reserve, until March 1968, when they were stripped for parts reusable in the South Island, including even boilers. However, the coal-burning J class managed to last longer in service, with the final three members of the class receiving A grade overhauls at Hillside in 1967. Two recycled North Island JA boilers were approved for refitting to the J class in mid and late 1967, In 1964 one of the West Coast J class locomotives, J 1212, was reboilered with the boiler of the first North Island JA withdrawn  The last three Js to receive A-grade overhauls in 1967 was 1211 (reboilered with a spare North British JA boiler supplied in 1953, which had been used on JB 1230 from 1959 until 1230 was scrapped in 1964) and 1234 and 1236 were frequently used on the South Island Limited in 1968 and 1969, on train 143 out of Christchurch and train 144 return of the Oamaru-Christchurch leg. And continued use on the South Island Limited, until the diesel-hauled, Southerner replaced it in November 1970 and on the twice-weekly overnight weekend, (a unique passenger and fast freight combined service) which like 143/144 was a demanding run requiring a lot of longer than scheduled stops, for freight to be shunted and mail handled. 

By mid-1970 only JA 1267 in good condition and three J and two other JA locomotives were acceptable, while the number of A-grade overhauled, intended to cover 4 year service of J/JA by the end of 1967, should easily have covered requirements on the South Island Limited until the end of 1970, general maintenance and resources were much reduced after the end of use of South Island steam on general freight in April 1969 and the delayed arrival of the North Island Silver Star carriages from Japan by a year, meant that steam heat vans to allow diesel to operate night trains would not be available till late 1971. Half a dozen of the other JAs remained, usable but in dubious condition for use on the weekend 189/190 until the end of steam on 26 October 1971.

Preservation 

Three J class locomotives have been preserved, but none of the original JB class survives: 

 J 1211 "Gloria" was purchased by Ian Welch, Russell Gibbard and Reid McNaught in 1972 for use with Steam Incorporated, and later was bought outright by Ian Welch. After use on the Bay of Islands Vintage Railway in 1985, 1211 was moved to the Glenbrook Vintage Railway for an overhaul to mainline running. It was first used on mainline excursions during the Rail 125 event in 1988, where it debuted in imitation of the original streamlining the class wore. Becoming the first operational locomotive of Mainline Steam, the locomotive saw use in both Islands hauling excursions. It was converted to oil firing in 1996 in the same manner as the JB class, with the oil bunker being re-instated in the North British JA tender this locomotive has been preserved with. The locomotive is named "Gloria" after owner Ian Welch's wife. It underwent a boiler overhaul 2013 to 2018 and returned to service in December 2018. J 1211 is currently based at the Glenbrook Vintage Railway.

 J 1234 was purchased by Steam Incorporated in 1972. Arriving at Steam Incorporated's Paekakariki base in 1974, it was kept in serviceable condition until 1992 when it was certified for use on the mainline network. In 1998 it was leased to the Glenbrook Vintage Railway, who used it until 2003 and afterwards it was stored awaiting eventual return to Paekakariki. It was finally returned in 2016 and is currently stored awaiting eventual overhaul. 

 J 1236 "Joanne" was purchased by the Railway Enthusiasts Society for use with JA 1250 on its "South Pacific Steam Safari" tour, making use of the fact that New Zealand Railways would only allow steam locomotives to be used on delivery trips after the end of steam. Surplus to requirements after this trip, it was bought by Mr P. Bulcher who moved the locomotive to the Museum of Transport and Technology, Auckland where it was displayed alongside K 900. In 1988 J 1236 was sold to Ian Welch of Mainline Steam and moved to the group's Parnell depot. The locomotive has been restored as a JB class oil burner by Mainline Steam, although this particular locomotive spent its entire NZR career as a coal-burning J class. It first returned to the main line in 2001, and after initially being based in Auckland it was transferred to Christchurch in 2004. In 2011 it moved to the group's Plimmerton depot for an overhaul and returned to service in 2017 sporting some non-prototypical features. It is named "Joanne" after one of owner Ian Welch's daughters.

No JB class locomotives were preserved, although the tender from JB 1203 is held by Steam Incorporated.

References

Footnotes

Citations

Bibliography

External links
NZR Steam locomotives - J class (4-8-2)

J class (1939)
4-8-2 locomotives
NBL locomotives
3 ft 6 in gauge locomotives of New Zealand
Railway locomotives introduced in 1939